The Walthamstow Wolves were a  speedway team which operated from 1934 and again from 1949 until their closure in 1951.

History
The club opened in 1934 competing in the National League, when Lea Bridge were forced to find a new venue. They finished ninth in the 1934 Speedway National League. After the 1934 season the Wolves were forced to relocate due to noise complaints. They moved to the Hackney Wick Stadium as the Hackney Wick Wolves.

In 1949 saw the track join the National League Division Two but struggled to attract good crowds, situated between Division one tracks at West Ham and Harringay. The team raced for three years but finally closed in 1951 due to declining attendance and complaints of noise from local residents.

The track was later covered in tarmac for easier maintenance of the greyhound racing track. The stadium was sold in August 2008 and demolished to make way for a housing development.

Season summary

Notable Walthamstow riders

References

Defunct British speedway teams
Speedway teams in London
Walthamstow